Tatargina sipahi is a moth in the family Erebidae. It was described by Frederic Moore in 1872. It is found in southern India.

References

Moths described in 1872
Spilosomina